Rachel K Collier is a Welsh electronic music producer and performer from Swansea, Wales. She studied Creative Music Technology (BMus) for four years at the Royal Welsh College of Music & Drama before moving to London to further pursue her music career.

Music career

2012: Hard Road to Travel
In May 2012 Rachel recorded "Hard Road to Travel", a song originally recorded by Jimmy Cliff in 1967. The song was then released commercially by Saatchi & Saatchi, peaking at 79 on the UK Singles Chart after being featured in a QualitySolicitors advert. This was followed up in July 2012 with the release of the collaboration with Wookie (musician) on the single "2 Us".

2013–2014: Boom Boom (Heartbeat) & breakthrough
In August 2013 Rachel featured on Ray Foxx's single "Boom Boom (Heartbeat)". The song peaked at number 12 on the UK Singles Chart, number 2 on the UK Dance Chart and number 13 on the Scottish Singles Chart. "Boom Boom (Heartbeat)" was also nominated for "Best Collaboration" at the Urban Music Awards 2013.

November 2013 saw another collaboration, this time with Mat Zo on the track "Only For You (feat. Rachel K Collier)", the second track on the album "Damage Control" with Rachel credited as co-writer and featured vocalist.

Rachel's debut single "Predictions", Sarah Jane Crawford's 'Smash' of the week on BBC Radio 1Xtra in November 2013, was released on 13 January 2014 on Strictly Rhythm.

Discography

Singles

As lead artist

As featured artist

Awards
Urban Music Awards nomination for Best Collaboration, together with Ray Foxx

References

Year of birth missing (living people)
21st-century Welsh women singers
Living people
Musicians from Swansea
Alumni of the Royal Welsh College of Music & Drama
Welsh electronic musicians